Muzhi is the name of several rural localities in Russia:
Muzhi, Pskov Oblast, a village in Pytalovsky District of Pskov Oblast
Muzhi, Yamalo-Nenets Autonomous Okrug, a selo in Shuryshkarsky District of Yamalo-Nenets Autonomous Okrug